District 7 of the Texas Senate is a senatorial district that serves a portion of Harris county in the U.S. state of Texas. The current Senator from District 7 is Paul Bettencourt.

Election history 
Election history of District 7 from 1992.

Most recent election

2006

Previous elections

2002

2000

1996

1994

1992

District officeholders

References

07
Harris County, Texas